Denis Bodrov (born August 22, 1986) is a Russian professional ice hockey defenseman currently an unrestricted free agent. He most recently played for HC Sibir Novosibirsk of the Kontinental Hockey League (KHL).

Playing career
Bodrov was drafted by the Philadelphia Flyers in the second round, 55th overall, of the 2006 NHL Entry Draft. He played three seasons for Lada Togliatti in the Russian Superleague and split the 2008–09 KHL season with Lada Togliatti and Atlant Moscow Oblast.

After three seasons with Salavat Yulaev Ufa, Bodrov left as a free agent and signed a two-year contract with Avtomobilist Yekaterinburg prior to the 2017–18 season, on May 8, 2017.

In the midst of his fourth year with Avtomobilist during the 2020–21 season, Bodrov left the club after 12 games and signed for the remainder of the year with Traktor Chelyabinsk on 17 December 2020.

After concluding his contract with Traktor, Bodrov left as a free agent in the off-season, securing a one-year contract with HC Sibir Novosibirsk on 11 May 2021.

Career statistics

Regular season and playoffs

International

References

External links

1986 births
Ice hockey people from Moscow
Adirondack Phantoms players
Atlant Moscow Oblast players
Avtomobilist Yekaterinburg players
HC Lada Togliatti players
Living people
Philadelphia Flyers draft picks
Russian ice hockey defencemen
Salavat Yulaev Ufa players
HC Spartak Moscow players
HC Sibir Novosibirsk players
Traktor Chelyabinsk players